Road Radio is a 1995 album by Skydiggers.

Track listing
 "Maple Syrup Song"  – 0:51 (Finlayson/Maize)
 "Toss & Turn"  – 2:53 (P.Cash)
 "Alice Graham"  – 3:01 (Finlayson/Maize)
 "Drive Away"  – 4:03 (P.Cash)
 "Radio Waves"  – 2:33 (Macey/Chambers/Skydiggers)
 "What Do You See?"  – 2:54 (P.Cash/A.Cash)
 "It's a Pity"  – 4:53 (Finlayson/Maize)
 "You've Got a Lot of Nerve"  – 3:37 (A.Cash)
 "Down in the Hole"  – 4:23 (Finlayson/Maize)
 "Long Long Time"  – 3:23 (Finlayson/Maize)
 "Endless Grey Night"  – 4:35 (P.Cash)
 "Even When You Fall"  – 4:05 (Finlayson/Maize)
 "Perch Platter"  – 0:40 (Skydiggers)
 "Just Another Day"  – 2:55 (P.Cash)

1995 albums
Skydiggers albums